Richard A. Parker (born 29 January 1953, in Surrey) is a mathematician and freelance computer programmer in Cambridge, England. He invented many of the algorithms for computing the modular character tables  of finite simple groups. He discovered the relation between Niemeier lattices and
deep holes of the Leech lattice, and  constructed Parker's Moufang loop of order 213 (which was used by John Horton Conway in his construction of the monster group).

Books
Conway, J. H.; Sloane, N. J. A. (1999).  Sphere packings, lattices and groups. (3rd ed.)  With additional contributions by E. Bannai, R. E. Borcherds, John Leech,  Simon P. Norton, A. M. Odlyzko, R. A. Parker, L. Queen and B. B. Venkov. Grundlehren der Mathematischen Wissenschaften, 290.  New York: Springer-Verlag.  .
 
An Atlas of Brauer Characters (London Mathematical Society Monographs) by Christopher Jansen, Klaus Lux, Richard Parker, Robert Wilson. Oxford University Press, U.S. (October 1, 1995)

References 

Alumni of St John's College, Cambridge
20th-century English mathematicians
21st-century English mathematicians
Group theorists
1953 births
Living people